Penoscrotal transposition (PST) is a group of congenital defects involving an abnormal spatial arrangement of penis and scrotum.

Types 
There are two types of penoscrotal transposition.
 Complete penoscrotal transposition
 Incomplete penoscrotal transposition

In incomplete penoscrotal transposition, penis is located in the middle of the scrotum, but in complete transposition, penis is located in the perineum.

Causes

Treatment 
Gold standard of PST treatment is surgical repair. Repair technique of penoscrotal transposition included a Glenn–Anderson technique, which is developed by F. Glenn and E. Everett Anderson.

References 

Congenital disorders of urinary system
Congenital disorders of male genital organs
Penis
Intersex variations